Ugo Pietro Spinola (29 June 1791 – 21 January 1858) was a Catholic cardinal and was Apostolic Nuncio to Austria and camerlengo of the Sacred College of Cardinals.

Early life
Spinola was born on 29 June 1791 in Genoa.

He was educated at the Collegio dei Protonotari in Rome where he received a doctorate in utroque iuris (both civil and canon law) in 1814).

Priesthood
He was ordained on 23 December 1815 and was named a papal delegate (diplomat) to various cities including:

1816 - Ascoli
1818 - Viterbo and Perugia
1823 - Macerata
1825 - Macerata and Camerino

He was elected titular archbishop of Thebae in 1826 and Apostolic Nuncio to Austria between 1826 and 1832.

Cardinalate
In 1832 Spinola was revealed as a cardinal, having been elevated to cardinal (in pectore) in 1831. He was appointed Abbot commendatario of Subiaco in 1838 and held this position until 1842. He participated in the Papal Conclave of 1846 which elected Pope Pius IX. Between 1857 and 1858 he held the post of camerlengo of the Sacred College of Cardinals.

He died on 21 January 1858 in Rome. (Note: some records indicate he may have died on either 23 or 24 January 1858)

See also
College of Cardinals

References

1791 births
1858 deaths
19th-century Italian cardinals
Apostolic Nuncios to Austria
Latin archbishops of Thebes
Cardinals created by Pope Gregory XVI